The 3rd Emmy Awards, retroactively known as the 3rd Primetime Emmy Awards after the debut of the Daytime Emmy Awards, were presented at the Ambassador Hotel in Los Angeles, California on January 23, 1951.

This would be the last year that the Emmys were primarily given out to shows that were produced or aired in the Los Angeles area. Starting with the 4th Annual Emmy Awards, nominations were considered on a national television network basis.

Winners and nominees
Winners are listed first, highlighted in boldface, and indicated with a double dagger (‡).

Programs

Acting

Hosting

Special Events

Station Awards
KTLA for Station Achievement
KNBH for Technical Achievement

References

External links
 Emmys.com list of 1951 Nominees & Winners
 

003
Emmy Awards
January 1951 events in the United States
1951 in American television
1951 in Los Angeles